Karel Thijs (5 May 1918 – 5 March 1990) was a Belgian racing cyclist. He won the 1942 edition of La Flèche Wallonne.

References

External links
 

1918 births
1990 deaths
Belgian male cyclists
Cyclists from Antwerp